Do Hoang Diem (Đỗ Hoàng Điềm, also known as Diem Do) is the current chairman of pro-democracy Việt Tân. He is a prominent leader in the Vietnamese democracy movement.

Early life and career 

Do Hoang Diem graduated from the University of Houston with an MBA degree. Following business school, he worked as an executive in industries including banking, entertainment, health care and electronics.

Diem became very active in the Vietnamese American community. He served on the Vietnamese Professionals Society's first Board of Directors from 1991 to 1992, was a radio and TV talk show host for Little Saigon Broadcasting and was also a member of the Executive Board of the Vietnamese Community of Southern California. Most notably, as a member of the Vietnamese Public Affairs Committee (VPAC), a grassroots organization aiming to empower Vietnamese Americans, he testified numerous times in the United States Congress about human rights violations in Vietnam and US-Vietnam relations.

International advocacy 

As chairman of Việt Tân, Do Hoang Diem meets with policymakers and non-governmental organizations in Canberra, Paris, Washington, D.C and other capitals.

Speaking before the Congressional Human Rights Caucus on May 10, 2007, Diem stated: "It is no longer the question of if democracy will triumph in Vietnam, but when." In his testimony, he recommended Congress to pressure the Vietnamese government to stop jamming Radio Free Asia broadcasts.

On May 29, 2007, chairman Do Hoang Diem was invited by US president George W. Bush together with three other Vietnamese-American activists to the White House on a meeting about Vietnam's increasingly harsh treatment of anti-government activists and an upcoming visit by Vietnam's president Nguyen Minh Triet to the United States. During the 45-minute meeting, Do Hoang Diem urged the president to increase pressure on Vietnam to respect human rights and asked for the United States to support openly democratic forces to bring change to Hanoi. During Nguyen Minh Triet's visit to the US, Do Hoang Diem also met with House Speaker Nancy Pelosi shortly before her meeting with the Vietnamese president to stress the importance of raising the issue of Vietnam's poor human rights record.

On March 12, 2008, he appeared before the U.S. Senate Foreign Relations Committee's subcommittee on East Asian and Pacific Affairs to encourage lawmakers to call for the release of imprisoned activists in Vietnam including several Việt Tân members. He told the Senate panel: "After more than 50 years in power, for the first time, the Vietnamese Communist Party is facing numerous and unprecedented challenges to its rule. The desire for real changes in Vietnam is stronger now than ever before. In response, the regime is using terror tactics to silence opposition, and severely violate human rights of not just political dissidents but also bloggers, farmers, workers, students or whoever dares to question the regime's authority."

On March 19, 2009, Diem testified before the Human Rights Sub-Committee of the Australian Parliament. He addressed the issues of arbitrary arrest and detention, freedom of expression, religious freedom and workers rights.

He is a frequent speaker at public events. His op-ed articles on Vietnam have been published in the Wall Street Journal and Asia Times.

During 2013 Conviction of 14 Vietnamese Dissidents, he also appeared on public media including Saigon Broadcasting Television Network as well as Al Jazeera to speak out against this "blatant crackdown."

Việt Tân membership 

Diem joined Việt Tân in 1982 while he was still in college. Diem eventually quit as a senior health care executive to work full-time in Việt Tân.

After having been a member for almost ten years, he became the Southern Californian Regional Director from 1991 to 1995, afterwards he became the External Affairs Director from 1996 to 2004, and briefly held the position of Policy Director in 2005-2006. In September 2006 at the 6th Party Congress, he was elected as the chairman of Việt Tân, replacing the previous chairman, Nguyễn Kim.

See also
 Việt Tân
 Hoang Tu Duy
 Nguyen Quoc Quan

References

External links
 Short biography
 Do Hoang Diem speaks at University of California, Los Angeles
 Do Hoang Diem addresses news conference at Reporters Without Borders headquarters in Paris
 Interview with Viet Tan chairman Do Hoang Diem on Saigon Broadcasting Television Network - Part 1 and Part 2
 Interview with Viet Tan chairman Do Hoang Diem on Al Jazeera

1963 births
Living people
University of California, Irvine alumni
Vietnamese emigrants to the United States